Knyaz Suvorov was one of five  pre-dreadnought battleships built for the Imperial Russian Navy in the first decade of the 20th century. Completed after the beginning of the Russo-Japanese War in 1904, she became the flagship of Vice admiral Zinovy Rozhestvensky, commander of the Second Pacific Squadron. The squadron was sent to the Far East a few months after her completion to break the Japanese blockade of Port Arthur. The Japanese captured the port while the squadron was in transit and their destination was changed to Vladivostok.  During the Battle of Tsushima on 27 May 1905, the ship fell out of the battle line after a shell hit her bridge, killing her helmsman and wounding her captain and Rozhestvensky. Knyaz Suvorov was eventually torpedoed and sunk by Japanese torpedo boats; other than 20 wounded officers evacuated by a destroyer, there were no survivors.

Description

The Borodino-class ships were based on the design of the French-built , modified to suit Russian equipment and building practices. They were built under the 1898 program "for the needs of the Far East" to concentrate ten battleships in the Pacific. Her intended crew consisted of 28 officers and 754 enlisted men, although she carried 928 crewmen during the Battle of Tsushima.

The ships were powered by a pair of vertical triple-expansion steam engines, each driving one propeller shaft, using steam generated by 20 Belleville boilers.

The main battery of the Borodinos consisted of four  Pattern 1895 guns which were mounted in two twin-gun turrets, one each fore and aft of the superstructure. Their secondary armament of twelve  Pattern 1892 guns were mounted in six twin-gun turrets carried on the upper deck, three turrets on each broadside. Defense against torpedo boats was provided by a suite of smaller guns. The twenty  Pattern 1892 guns carried were mounted in casemates in the sides of the hull. The ships also mounted twenty QF 3-pounder Hotchkiss guns in the superstructure. The ships were fitted with four  torpedo tubes, one each above water in the bow and in the stern, and a submerged tube on each broadside.

The  armored lower deck sloped downwards to connect to the anti-torpedo bulkhead of the same thickness.

Service

Construction began on Knyaz Suvorov, named after Prince Alexander Suvorov, on 10 August 1901 at the Baltic Works in Saint Petersburg. The ship was laid down on 8 September, when the ceremonial laying of one of the plates was performed by Grand Duke Alexei Alexandrovich, General-Admiral of the Imperial Russian Navy. She was launched on 25 September 1902, in the presence of Tsar Nicholas II of Russia, Grand Duke Konstantin, and King George I of Greece. She was completed in September 1904, after the beginning of the Russo-Japanese War, at the cost of 13,841,000 rubles.

On 15 October 1904, Knyaz Suvorov, Rozhestvensky's flagship as commander of the Second Pacific Squadron, set sail for Port Arthur from Libau along with the other vessels of the squadron with the mission of reinforcing the First Pacific Squadron at Port Arthur and breaking the Japanese blockade. Rozhestvensky had received numerous reports of Japanese agents and torpedo boats disguised as fishing vessels before sailing and he ordered maximum alertness after coaling at Skagen, Denmark, on 7 October. Early on the evening of the following day, when the squadron was near the Dogger Bank, the auxiliary repair ship Kamchatka reported that she was under attack by torpedo boats in the rain. About four hours later, the squadron encountered British fishing trawlers working the Dogger Bank in the fog and opened fire on them at very short range. One trawler was sunk and at least three others were damaged; several fishermen were killed and others wounded. The incident enraged the British population and caused a diplomatic incident with the British that nearly led to war until Russia apologized and agreed to pay reparations on 29 October.

Rozhestvensky led his ships down the Atlantic coast of Africa, rounding the Cape of Good Hope, and reached the island of Nosy Be off the northwest coast of French Madagascar on 9 January 1905 where they remained for two months while Rozhestvensky finalized his coaling arrangements. During this time, he learned of the capture of Port Arthur and changed his destination to Vladivostok, the only other port controlled by the Russians in the Far East. The squadron sailed for Cam Ranh Bay, French Indochina, on 16 March, and reached it almost a month later to await the obsolete ships of the Third Pacific Squadron, commanded by Rear Admiral Nikolai Nebogatov. The latter ships reached Cam Ranh Bay on 9 May and the combined force sailed for Vladivostok on 14 May. En route, Rozhestvensky reorganized his ships into three tactical divisions for the forthcoming battle; the leading division consisted of the four new s with Knyaz Suvorov in the lead, followed by the Second Division that consisted of three older battleships and an armored cruiser, and Nebogatov retained his ships as the Third Division. While exact figures are not available, it is probable that Knyaz Suvorov was approximately  overweight, as she and her sisters were overloaded with coal and other supplies, all of which was stored high in the ships and reduced their stability.

Battle of Tsushima

Rozhestvensky decided to take the most direct route to Vladivostok using the Tsushima Strait and was intercepted by the Japanese battlefleet under the command of Admiral Tōgō Heihachirō on 27 May 1905. As the Russians entered the strait, they were arrayed in separate columns with the Second Division on the left and the Third trailing. Around noon, well after they had been spotted by the Japanese, Rozhestvensky ordered the Second Division, led by the battleship , to form line ahead behind the First Division, but poorly trained signalmen caused confusion throughout the fleet and the Third Division fell in behind the Second Division, leaving the First Division on the main column's right, although it was still in the lead. When the main Japanese fleet was spotted by the Russians at 13:19, Rozhestvensky was still trying to get his ships properly formed.

The location sent to Tōgō had been inaccurate and his ships were out of position when they spotted the Russians; unwilling to engage the First Division, Tōgō maneuvered his ships across the front of the Russian forces and then reversed course to position his battleships on the left flank of the leading Russian ships. Mikasa began to return fire after the Japanese ships had finished their maneuver and was joined by the battleship  and the armored cruiser  as the Japanese battleships split their fire between Knyaz Suvorov and Oslyabya. Around 14:20, the battleship  joined the others firing at Knyaz Suvorov, which had been set on fire by hits from the other ships. At 14:35, splinters entered the conning tower, killing her helmsman and wounding Rozhestvensky and the ship's captain; splinters from another shell again wounded Rozhestvensky so he drifted in and out of consciousness. Shortly afterwards, flames made the conning tower untenable so that the ship had to be steered from her auxiliary-control position. Around 14:52, another hit jammed the steering gear after a  four point turn to starboard had been ordered and caused the ship to make nearly a full circle before she could be steered by her engines. Splinters from numerous shell hits shredded water hoses and made it much more difficult to put the numerous fires out. By this time, Knyaz Suvorovs aft 12-inch gun turret had been destroyed by an explosion that blew its roof off onto the quarterdeck, her forward funnel had fallen down, and her mainmast had been shot away.

Knyaz Suvorov never regained her position in the battle line and was engaged at short range by Mikasa and the battleship  as well as five cruisers of Vice Admiral Kamimura Hikonojō's 2nd Division between 15:20 and 15:35. Mikasa and two of the cruisers fired one torpedo each at her during this time, but none of them hit the ship. At 15:39, the cruiser  fired a pair of torpedoes and claimed one hit although no change was visible in Knyaz Suvorovs condition. Chihaya was hit by one shell just above the waterline during her attack that forced her to make emergency repairs. Around 15:40, the British observer aboard Azuma recorded that Knyaz Suvorov was down by the bow with a heavy list to port and was covered by thick gray smoke from the forecastle to the mainmast. By this time, the ship's forward 12-inch gun turret had been knocked out, but some smaller guns were still in action. The Japanese 5th Destroyer Division attacked five minutes later with torpedoes at ranges under , but failed to score any hits with their five torpedoes. The flotilla leader was hit in the boiler room by a three-inch shell that may have been fired by Knyaz Suvorov.

The ship found herself between the two fleets at 16:08 and was fired at by most of the Japanese ships at short range. Observers aboard those ships noted that she resembled "an island volcano in eruption". Mikasa fired two torpedoes and Shikishima fired one torpedo at Knyaz Suvorov during this time without effect. Captain William C. Pakenham, the Royal Navy's official military observer aboard Asahi under the Anglo-Japanese Alliance, noted that Knyaz Suvorov was hit by a 12-inch shell near the rear 6-inch turret around 16:30 that caused an explosion and caused flames to spout  in the air. At 17:05 the 4th Destroyer Division attacked with three destroyers; only one of the six torpedoes hit Knyaz Suvorov. The ship immediately took on a 10° list, but showed no signs of sinking. One shell from Knyaz Suvorov struck the destroyer , but did not inflict much damage.

Around 17:30, the  came and took off the wounded officers from Knyaz Suvorov, including Rozhestvensky, leaving an unwounded midshipman in command. They fired seven torpedoes of which two or three hit the ship. One was thought to have caused a magazine to explode as a cloud of yellow and black smoke poured out and Knyaz Suvorov listed further to port before capsizing at about 19:30. Other than the 20 officers taken off by Buinyi, there were no survivors of the 928 crew aboard. Naval historian Sir Julian Corbett commented: "While she had a gun above water she fired, and not a man survived her of all that crew, to whose stubborn gallantry no words can do justice. If there is immortality in naval memory it is hers and theirs."

Notes

Footnotes

Bibliography

Further reading
 

Borodino-class battleships
1902 ships
Ships built at the Baltic Shipyard
Russo-Japanese War battleships of Russia
Shipwrecks in the Tsushima Strait
Shipwrecks of the Russo-Japanese War
Alexander Suvorov
Maritime incidents in 1905